Paul F. Malloy (born April 29, 1940) is an American attorney and former politician who served four terms in the Massachusetts House of Representatives. A member of the Democratic Party, he was elected shortly after his graduation from law school. He represented the city of Newton, Massachusetts in the legislature.

References

External links

1940 births
Living people
Politicians from Newton, Massachusetts
Democratic Party members of the Massachusetts House of Representatives
20th-century American politicians
Suffolk University alumni